Gabriel Rodríguez (born August 7, 1979 in Valencia, Venezuela) is a Venezuelan sprint canoer. He competed in the late 2000s. At the 2008 Summer Olympics in Beijing, he was eliminated in the semifinals of both the K-2 500 m and the K-2 1000 m events.

References
 

1979 births
Sportspeople from Valencia, Venezuela
Canoeists at the 2007 Pan American Games
Canoeists at the 2008 Summer Olympics
Olympic canoeists of Venezuela
Venezuelan male canoeists
Living people
Pan American Games medalists in canoeing
Pan American Games bronze medalists for Venezuela

Central American and Caribbean Games gold medalists for Venezuela
Central American and Caribbean Games bronze medalists for Venezuela
South American Games bronze medalists for Venezuela
South American Games medalists in canoeing
Competitors at the 2010 South American Games
Competitors at the 2006 Central American and Caribbean Games
Central American and Caribbean Games medalists in canoeing
Medalists at the 2007 Pan American Games
20th-century Venezuelan people
21st-century Venezuelan people